Tony Kinloch Ph.D., DSc (Eng), FCGI, FIMMM, FIMechE, FRSC, FREng, FRS is a 'Professor of Adhesion' at The Department of Mechanical Engineering of Imperial College London and is a visiting professor at the Universities of New South Wales and Sydney, Australia.

Education 
Kinloch attended the Queen Mary College, University of London, and was awarded his Ph.D. in 1972 on Mechanics of Adhesive Failure, supervised by Edgar Andrews and A.N. Gent.

Achievements 
During his time at Imperial College, Kinloch published over three hundred patents and papers, writing and editing seven books. Between 2007 & 2012 he was the Head of the Department of Mechanical Engineering and under his supervision over fifty students obtained their Ph.D.

Awards 
 1992 - US Adhesion Society 3M Award for 'Excellence in Adhesion Science'
 1994 -  Adhesion Society of Japan Award for Distinguished Contributions to the Development of Adhesion Science and Technology
 1995 -  Elected as  'R.L. Patrick Fellow' of the Adhesion Society
 1996 -  Awarded the 'A. A . Griffith Medal and Prize' from the Institute of Materials, UK
 1997 - Elected a Fellow of the Royal Academy of Engineering
 1997 - Awarded the 'Hawksley Gold Medal' from the Institution of Mechanical Engineers, UK. 
 2001 - Invitation to give 'The Dow Honorary Lecture' of the University of Massachusetts, Amherst, USA. 
 2002 - Awarded The 'Wake Memorial Medal' from the Institute of Materials, UK 2002 -  'R & D Scientist of the Year' by the US Adhesives Age Journal.
 2002-2004 - Elected President of the US Adhesion Society
 2007 - Elected as a Fellow of the Royal Society. 
 2009 - Awarded 'The Royal Society Armourers & Brasiers' Company Prize for ‘Excellence in Materials Science and Technology’ and the 'Le Prix Dédale de la Sociéte Française d’Adhesion'
 2016 - Elected a Fellow of the European Structural Integrity Society
 2017 - Elected a Fellow of the International Congress of Fracture
 2021 - Presented with The Presidents Award form the US Adhesion Society

References

External links 
 Professor Tony Kinloch
 

1946 births
Living people
Fellows of the Royal Society
Fellows of the Royal Academy of Engineering
Alumni of Queen Mary University of London
20th-century British engineers
21st-century British engineers
British materials scientists
Academics of Imperial College London
Alumni of the University of London
British mechanical engineers
Fellows of the Institute of Materials, Minerals and Mining